Boris Berman may refer to several people, including:

 Boris Berman (chekist) (1901–1939), Soviet NKVD member active during the Great Purge
 Boris Berman (journalist) (born 1948), Russian journalist and broadcaster
 Boris Berman (musician) (born 1948), Russian pianist